The Man Who Invented Christmas may refer to:

 The Man Who Invented Christmas, a 2008 novel by Les Standiford
 The Man Who Invented Christmas (film), a 2017 film based on the novel